Rai Hassan Nawaz (born 1 November 1955) is a Pakistani politician who was a member of the National Assembly of Pakistan between 2013 and 2015. Previously, he served three terms on the Punjab Assembly, from 1988 to 1990, 1990 to 1993, and 1997 to 1999. He was disqualified for life in February 2015 by Supreme Court of Pakistan on charges of concealing Assets.

Political career
He was elected to the Provincial Assembly of the Punjab as a candidate for Islami Jamhoori Ittehad (IJI) for Constituency PP-185 (Sahiwal) in 1988 Pakistani general election and served as advisor to the Chief Minister of Punjab Nawaz Sharif.

He was re-elected to the Provincial Assembly of the Punjab as a candidate for IJI for Constituency PP-185 (Sahiwal) in 1990 Pakistani general election and served as advisor to the Chief Minister of Punjab.

He was re-elected to the Provincial Assembly of the Punjab as a candidate for Pakistan Muslim League (N) for Constituency PP-185 (Sahiwal) in 1997 Pakistani general election.

He served as district nazim of Sahiwal District in 2005.

He was elected to the National Assembly of Pakistan from Constituency NA-162 as a candidate of Pakistan Tehreek-e-Insaf in 2013 Pakistani general election. He was disqualified for life in February 2015 by Supreme Court of Pakistan on charges of concealing Assets.

References

Living people
Pakistani MNAs 2013–2018
Punjab MPAs 1988–1990
Punjab MPAs 1990–1993
Punjab MPAs 1997–1999
Politicians from Sahiwal
Pakistan Tehreek-e-Insaf MNAs
Expelled members of the National Assembly of Pakistan
Pakistan Muslim League (N) MPAs (Punjab)
1955 births